Future University in Egypt (FUE; Arabic: جامعة المستقبل) is a private university located in 90 street, New Cairo, Egypt and was founded in 2006 by the Azazy Group.

Faculties

 Faculty of Oral and Dental Medicine
 Faculty of Pharmaceutical Sciences and Pharmaceutical Industries
 Faculty of Engineering and Technology
 Faculty of Economics and Political Science
 Faculty of Commerce and Business Administration
 Faculty of Computers and Information Technology

Each faculty is an independent institution with its own property and equipment. The faculties are responsible for selecting students, in accordance with University regulations. Degrees are awarded by the university.

Partnerships

Academic partnerships
The list includes academic cooperation agreements signed with other universities. Agreements could include faculty and student exchange, mutual accreditation of degrees, continuing education and certificate programs.
 University of Cincinnati
 University College Cork
 Missouri University of Science and Technology
 Nova Southeastern University
 University of Latvia, Faculty of Business, Economics and Management
 Louisiana State University
 University of Maryland
 University of Connecticut, School of Engineering
 Southern Illinois University
 Wright State University
 University of New Mexico
 Case Western Reserve University

Corporate partnerships
 Bavarian Auto Group
 ASEA Brown Boveri 
 British Council
 Schneider Electric

Key people

Board of Trustees
 Dr. Jehan Sadat
 Dr. Farouk El-Baz
 Dr. Mostafa El-Sayed
 Dr. Hany Mahfouz Helal
 Dr. Ahmed Zaki Badr
 Engineer Hani Azer
 Engineer Farid El Tobgui

Board of Advisers
 Prof. Dr. Anthony Perzigian, Board of Trustees, Chair Adviser for Quality Assurance & Academic Affairs.
 Prof. Dr. Adel Sakr, Board of Trustees, Chair Adviser for Graduate Studies, Research & International Affairs.
 Prof. Dr. Mohamed El Sharkawy, Professor of Engineering Systems. University of Washington, Seattle, Washington, U.S.
 Prof. Dr. Rita Hartung Cheng, President, Northern Arizona University, Flagstaff, Arizona, U.S.
 Prof. Dr. Gregory H. Williams, Past-President, University of Cincinnati, Cincinnati, Ohio, U.S.
 Prof. Dr. Kamal Sabra, Director of Pharmacy Service, St. James's University Hospital, Dublin 8, Ireland.
 Prof. Dr. Nabil Bissada, Professor of Dentistry, Case Western Reserve University, Cleveland, Ohio, U.S.
 Prof. Dr. David Hopkins, Wright State University, Dayton, Ohio, U.S.
 Dr. Hanan Khalifa, Head of Research and International Development, Cambridge University, the United Kingdom. 
 Dr. Robert Frank, Past-President, University of New Mexico, Albuquerque, New Mexico, U.S.

References

External links
 

Education in Cairo
Universities in Egypt
Educational institutions established in 2006
2006 establishments in Egypt